MCabber is a free software client for the instant messaging protocol XMPP with a text user interface based on ncurses. It runs on a range of platforms, including Linux, BSD, and Mac OS X. As free software it is freely available – including the source code – under the terms of the GNU GPL-2.0-or-later. MCabber is the successor of Alejandro Jimenez Macias's (AJMacias, Winnetou) earlier Cabber that has had releases from 2002 to 2004. In 2005 it has been forked off the last version of Cabber (0.5.0).

Features 
MCabber supports end-to-end encryption with either OpenPGP or Off-the-Record Messaging.
Furthermore, it supports:
 SASL/SSL/GnuTLS
 Multi-User Chat (MUC)
 Message Carbons (XEP-0280)
 History logging
 External action triggers
 Dynamic modules
 Enchant/Aspell for spellchecking
 Documentation available in English, Dutch, French, German, Italian, Polish, Russian and Ukrainian language.

See also 
 List of XMPP client software
 Comparison of instant messaging clients

External links 
 
 Official mirror

2005 software
Free XMPP clients
Instant messaging clients for Linux
MacOS instant messaging clients